Romesh Eranga (born 16 June 1985) is a Sri Lankan-born Canadian cricketer. He bowls left-arm medium-fast and bats left-handed. 

Eranga became only the third Sri Lankan to take eight wickets in a List A innings; he achieved the feat when he took 8/30 for Burgher Recreation Club against Sri Lanka Army Sports Club.

In October 2018, he was named in Canada's squad for the 2018–19 Regional Super50 tournament in the West Indies. He was the joint-leading wicket-taker in the tournament, with seventeen dismissals in six matches. In April 2019, he was named in Canada's squad for the 2019 ICC World Cricket League Division Two tournament in Namibia. In June 2019, he was selected to play for the Winnipeg Hawks franchise team in the 2019 Global T20 Canada tournament.

In August 2019, he was named in Canada's squad for the Regional Finals of the 2018–19 ICC T20 World Cup Americas Qualifier tournament. He made his Twenty20 International (T20I) debut for Canada against the Cayman Islands on 18 August 2019. In September 2019, he was named in Canada's squad for the 2019 Malaysia Cricket World Cup Challenge League A tournament. In October 2019, he was named in Canada's squad for the 2019 ICC T20 World Cup Qualifier tournament in the United Arab Emirates.

See also
 List of List A cricket records

References

1985 births
Living people
Sri Lankan cricketers
Canadian cricketers
Canada Twenty20 International cricketers
People from Ragama
Canadian people of Sri Lankan descent